Three on a Honeymoon (German: Hochzeitsreise zu dritt) is a 1932 Austrian comedy film directed by Erich Schmidt and starring Brigitte Helm, Oskar Karlweis and Susi Lanner. A separate French version Honeymoon Trip was also released.

The film's sets were designed by Artur Berger.

Cast
 Brigitte Helm as Anita Berndt  
 Oskar Karlweis as Heinz Schaller  
 Susi Lanner as Susi Lechner  
 Oskar Sima as Rudi Holzer  
 Fritz Wiesenthal as Mayer 
 Karl Ehmann as Johann, Diener 
 Albert Feller as Gesang  
 Darío Medina as Gesang

References

Bibliography 
 Bock, Hans-Michael & Bergfelder, Tim. The Concise Cinegraph: Encyclopaedia of German Cinema. Berghahn Books, 2009.

External links 
 

1932 films
Austrian comedy films
1932 comedy films
1930s German-language films
Films directed by Joe May
Austrian multilingual films
Films scored by Bronisław Kaper
Austrian black-and-white films
1932 multilingual films